SAS (previously "Statistical Analysis System") is a statistical software suite developed by SAS Institute for  data management, advanced analytics, multivariate analysis, business intelligence, criminal investigation, and predictive analytics.

SAS was developed at North Carolina State University from 1966 until 1976, when SAS Institute was incorporated. SAS was further developed in the 1980s and 1990s with the addition of new statistical procedures, additional components and the introduction of JMP. A point-and-click interface was added in version 9 in 2004. A social media analytics product was added in 2010.

Technical overview and terminology
SAS is a software suite that can mine, alter, manage and retrieve data from a variety of sources and perform statistical analysis on it. SAS provides a graphical point-and-click user interface for non-technical users and more through the SAS language.

SAS programs have DATA steps, which retrieve and manipulate data, and PROC steps, which analyze the data. Each step consists of a series of statements.

The DATA step has executable statements that result in the software taking an action, and declarative statements that provide instructions to read a data set or alter the data's appearance. The DATA step has two phases: compilation and execution. In the compilation phase, declarative statements are processed and syntax errors are identified. Afterwards, the execution phase processes each executable statement sequentially. Data sets are organized into tables with rows called "observations" and columns called "variables". Additionally, each piece of data has a descriptor and a value.

The PROC step consists of PROC statements that call upon named procedures. Procedures perform analysis and reporting on data sets to produce statistics, analyses, and graphics. There are more than 300 named procedures and each one contains a substantial body of programming and statistical work. PROC statements can also display results, sort data or perform other operations.

SAS macros are pieces of code or variables that are coded once and referenced to perform repetitive tasks.

SAS data can be published in HTML, PDF, Excel, RTF and other formats using the Output Delivery System, which was first introduced in 2007. The SAS Enterprise Guide is SAS's point-and-click interface. It generates code to manipulate data or perform analysis automatically and does not require SAS programming experience to use.

The SAS software suite has more than 200 components Some of the SAS components include:

History

Origins
The development of SAS began in 1966 after North Carolina State University re-hired Anthony Barr to program his analysis of variance and regression software so that it would run on IBM System/360 computers. The project was funded by the National Institutes of Health. and was originally intended to analyze agricultural data to improve crop yields. Barr was joined by student James Goodnight, who developed the software's statistical routines, and the two became project leaders. In 1968, Barr and Goodnight integrated new multiple regression and analysis of variance routines. In 1972, after issuing the first release of SAS, the project lost its funding. According to Goodnight, this was because NIH only wanted to fund projects with medical applications. Goodnight continued teaching at the university for a salary of $1 and access to mainframe computers for use with the project, until it was funded by the University Statisticians of the Southern Experiment Stations the following year. John Sall joined the project in 1973 and contributed to the software's econometrics, time series, and matrix algebra. Another early participant, Caroll G. Perkins, contributed to SAS' early programming. Jolayne W. Service and Jane T. Helwig created SAS' first documentation.

The first versions of SAS were named after the year in which they were released. In 1971, SAS 71 was published as a limited release. It was used only on IBM mainframes and had the main elements of SAS programming, such as the DATA step and the most common procedures in the PROC step. The following year a full version was released as SAS 72, which introduced the MERGE statement and added features for handling missing data or combining data sets. In 1976, Barr, Goodnight, Sall, and Helwig removed the project from North Carolina State and incorporated it into SAS Institute, Inc.

Development
SAS was redesigned in SAS 76 with an open architecture that allowed for compilers and procedures. The INPUT and INFILE statements were improved so they could read most data formats used by IBM mainframes. Generating reports was also added through the PUT and FILE statements. The ability to analyze general linear models was also added as was the FORMAT procedure, which allowed developers to customize the appearance of data. In 1979, SAS 79 added support for the CMS operating system and introduced the DATASETS procedure. Three years later, SAS 82 introduced an early macro language and the APPEND procedure.

SAS version 4 had limited features, but made SAS more accessible. Version 5 introduced a complete macro language, array subscripts, and a full-screen interactive user interface called Display Manager. In 1985, SAS was rewritten in the C programming language. This allowed for the SAS' Multivendor Architecture that allows the software to run on UNIX, MS-DOS, and Windows. It was previously written in PL/I, Fortran, and assembly language.

In the 1980s and 1990s, SAS released a number of components to complement Base SAS. SAS/GRAPH, which produces graphics, was released in 1980, as well as the SAS/ETS component, which supports econometric and time series analysis. A component intended for pharmaceutical users, SAS/PH-Clinical, was released in the 1990s. The Food and Drug Administration standardized on SAS/PH-Clinical for new drug applications in 2002. Vertical products like SAS Financial Management and SAS Human Capital Management (then called CFO Vision and HR Vision respectively) were also introduced. JMP was developed by SAS co-founder John Sall and a team of developers to take advantage of the graphical user interface introduced in the 1984 Apple Macintosh and shipped for the first time in 1989. Updated versions of JMP were released continuously after 2002 with the most recent release being from 2016.

SAS version 6 was used throughout the 1990s and was available on a wider range of operating systems, including Macintosh, OS/2, Silicon Graphics, and PRIMOS. SAS introduced new features through dot-releases. From 6.06 to 6.09, a user interface based on the windows paradigm was introduced and support for SQL was added. Version 7 introduced the Output Delivery System (ODS) and an improved text editor. ODS was improved upon in successive releases. For example, more output options were added in version 8. The number of operating systems that were supported was reduced to UNIX, Windows and z/OS, and Linux was added. SAS version 8 and SAS Enterprise Miner were released in 1999.

Recent history
In 2002, the Text Miner software was introduced. Text Miner analyzes text data like emails for patterns in business intelligence applications. In 2004, SAS Version 9.0 was released, which was dubbed "Project Mercury" and was designed to make SAS accessible to a broader range of business users. Version 9.0 added custom user interfaces based on the user's role and established the point-and-click user interface of SAS Enterprise Guide as the software's primary graphical user interface (GUI). The Customer Relationship Management (CRM) features were improved in 2004 with SAS Interaction Management. In 2008 SAS announced Project Unity, designed to integrate data quality, data integration and master data management.

SAS Institute Inc v World Programming Ltd was a lawsuit with developers of a competing implementation, World Programming System, alleging that they had infringed SAS's copyright in part by implementing the same functionality. This case was referred from the United Kingdom's High Court of Justice to the European Court of Justice on 11 August 2010. In May 2012, the European Court of Justice ruled in favor of World Programming, finding that "the functionality of a computer program and the programming language cannot be protected by copyright."

A free version was introduced for students in 2010. SAS Social Media Analytics, a tool for social media monitoring, engagement and sentiment analysis, was also released that year. SAS Rapid Predictive Modeler (RPM), which creates basic analytical models using Microsoft Excel, was introduced that same year. JMP 9 in 2010 added a new interface for using the R programming language from JMP and an add-in for Excel. The following year, a High Performance Computing appliance was made available in a partnership with Teradata and EMC Greenplum. In 2011, the company released Enterprise Miner 7.1. The company introduced 27 data management products from October 2013 to October 2014 and updates to 160 others. At the 2015 SAS Global Forum, it announced several new products that were specialized for different industries, as well as new training software.

Releases date
SAS had many releases since 1972. Since release 9.3, SAS/STAT has its own release numbering.

Software products
As of 2011 SAS's largest set of products is its line for customer intelligence. Numerous SAS modules for web, social media and marketing analytics may be used to profile customers and prospects, predict their behaviors and manage and optimize communications. SAS also provides the SAS Fraud Framework. The framework's primary functionality is to monitor transactions across different applications, networks and partners and use analytics to identify anomalies that are indicative of fraud. SAS Enterprise GRC (Governance, Risk and Compliance) provides risk modeling, scenario analysis and other functions in order to manage and visualize risk, compliance and corporate policies. There is also a SAS Enterprise Risk Management product-set designed primarily for banks and financial services organizations.

SAS' products for monitoring and managing the operations of IT systems are collectively referred to as SAS IT Management Solutions. SAS collects data from various IT assets on performance and utilization, then creates reports and analyses. SAS' Performance Management products consolidate and provide graphical displays for key performance indicators (KPIs) at the employee, department and organizational level. The SAS Supply Chain Intelligence product suite is offered for supply chain needs, such as forecasting product demand, managing distribution and inventory and optimizing pricing. There is also a "SAS for Sustainability Management" set of software to forecast environmental, social and economic effects and identify causal relationships between operations and an impact on the environment or ecosystem.

SAS has product sets for specific industries, such as government, retail, telecommunications and aerospace and for marketing optimization or high-performance computing.

Free University Edition
SAS previously offered a Free University Edition which could be downloaded by anyone for non-commercial use. The first announcement regarding this Free University Edition seems to have appeared in newspapers on 28 May 2014. However, in 2022, SAS Free University Edition was replaced by two entirely web-based versions: SAS OnDemand for Academics and SAS Viya for Learners.

Comparison to other products

In a 2005 article for the Journal of Marriage and Family comparing statistical packages from SAS and its competitors Stata and SPSS, Alan C. Acock wrote that SAS programs provide "extraordinary range of data analysis and data management tasks," but were difficult to use and learn. SPSS and Stata, meanwhile, were both easier to learn (with better documentation) but had less capable analytic abilities, though these could be expanded with paid (in SPSS) or free (in Stata) add-ons. Acock concluded that SAS was best for power users, while occasional users would benefit most from SPSS and Stata. A 2014 comparison by the University of California, Los Angeles, gave similar results.

Competitors such as Revolution Analytics and Alpine Data Labs advertise their products as considerably cheaper than SAS'. In a 2011 comparison, Doug Henschen of InformationWeek found that start-up fees for the three are similar, though he admitted that the starting fees were not necessarily the best basis for comparison. SAS' business model is not weighted as heavily on initial fees for its programs, instead focusing on revenue from annual subscription fees.

Adoption
According to IDC, SAS is the largest market-share holder in "advanced analytics" with 35.4 percent of the market as of 2013. It is the fifth largest market-share holder for business intelligence (BI) software with a 6.9% share and the largest independent vendor. It competes in the BI market against conglomerates, such as SAP BusinessObjects, IBM Cognos, SPSS Modeler, Oracle Hyperion, and Microsoft Power BI. SAS has been named in the Gartner Leader's Quadrant for Data Integration Tool and for Business Intelligence and Analytical Platforms.
A study published in 2011 in BMC Health Services Research found that SAS was used in 42.6 percent of data analyses in health service research, based on a sample of 1,139 articles drawn from three journals.

See also
 Comparison of numerical-analysis software
 Comparison of OLAP servers
 JMP (statistical software), also from SAS Institute Inc.
 SAS language
 R (programming language)

References

Further reading
 

 Wikiversity:Data Analysis using the SAS Language

External links
 
 SAS OnDemand for Academics No-cost access for learners (free SAS Profile required)
 A Glossary of SAS terminology
 SAS for Developers
 SAS community forums

Fourth-generation programming languages
Business intelligence software
C (programming language) software
Criminal investigation
Data mining and machine learning software
Data warehousing
 
Extract, transform, load tools
Mathematical optimization software
Numerical software
Proprietary commercial software for Linux
Proprietary cross-platform software
Science software for Linux